Corazón is the 16th album and 15th studio album of Puerto Rican singer Ednita Nazario. It was released on March 23, 1999.

Track listing
 "¿Quién Te Robó El Corazón?"
 "Pienso En Tí"
 "Corazón De Cristal Y Algodón"
 "No Me Digas Adiós"
 "Mas Grande Que Grande"
 "Perdiendo Tu Amor"
 "Corazón"
 "Di Tantas Veces"
 "Viene Y Va"
 "Tu Sabes Bien"

Singles
 "Mas Grande Que Grande"
 "Pienso En Tí"
 "¿Quién Te Robó El Corazón?"
 "Tu Sabes Bien"

Personnel
 Produced by Ednita Nazario and Robi Draco Rosa

Ednita Nazario albums
1999 albums
Albums produced by Draco Rosa